Ponometia exigua is a moth of the family Noctuidae first described by Johan Christian Fabricius in 1793. It is found from Georgia, south to Florida and west to Texas. Outside of the United States it is found in Jamaica, Cuba, Hispaniola, the Virgin Islands and Central America and South America down to Brazil.

It is a sexually dimorphic species. Males are pale yellow and their forewing is crossed with diffuse, sinuate olivaceous bands. The female forewing is dark fuscous with a wide, contrasting, pale fascia along the costa. In some females this pattern is less contrasting.

The larvae feed on Erechtites hieraciifolia and Waltheria ovata.

External links

Acontiinae
Moths described in 1793